The women's 3000 metres event  at the 2002 European Athletics Indoor Championships was held on March 3.

Results

References
Results

3000 metres at the European Athletics Indoor Championships
3000
2002 in women's athletics